The 2010 UIM F1 H2O World Championship was the 27th season of Formula 1 Powerboat racing, and the 30th anniversary year since the series' foundation in 1981. The calendar consisted of eight races, beginning in Portimão, Portugal on 9 May 2010, and ending in Sharjah, UAE on 10 December 2010. Sami Seliö finished the season as drivers' champion driving for Team Mad Croc, clinching his second title with his first having been in 2007.

Teams and drivers

Season calendar

A total of eight rounds comprised the 2010 championship, the same as in 2009. However the concept of running two races at each event, an idea introduced the previous year, was dropped for 2010, with the championship returning to the traditional format of practice and qualifying on the first day, and racing on the second. The Grand Prix of Finland, having been held at Lahti for the past two years, was replaced by a third Chinese race in Linyi which was announced at the beginning of the year. The initial calendar published by the UIM featured an additional race in the week following the St Petersburg event, however a location was never finalised, and it was dropped from the schedule.

Results and standings
Points were awarded to the top 10 classified finishers. A maximum of two boats per team were eligible for points in the teams' championship.

Drivers standings

Teams standings
Only boats with results eligible for points counting towards the teams' championship are shown here.

References

External links
 The official website of the UIM F1 H2O World Championship
 The official website of the Union Internationale Motonautique

F1 Powerboat World Championship
Formula 1 Powerboat seasons
F1 Powerboat World Championship